The Rookie Bear is a 1941 MGM cartoon featuring Barney Bear. It is the fourth cartoon in the Barney Bear series.

Plot
Barney Bear is selected by a drawn Draft Number to enlist in the United States Army. His hibernation is interrupted when a telegram is delivered to him. He misinterprets the words on the telegram, and assumes that it is an actual vacation. Barney enters the base with vacation supplies, but discovers his true purpose when bumping into the heavy artillery. He is refused departure.

He enlists through answering "simple" questions, having his photo taken, his physicality examined, his flat feet inflated, his teeth fixed and in the end, when he has passed all his exams, has his butt stamped. He finally gets his uniform, gun and gas mask "which is thoroughly tested".

His shoes get hotter and hotter until they sprout out popcorn.

The whole thing turns out to be a dream when a spit from Barney's fireplace wakes him up by burning his rear. Before Barney can go back to sleep, he receives a telegram telling him to enlist in the army, along with a P.S., saying "And this time, buddy, it ain't no dream!", much to Barney's dismay.

Reception
The Rookie Bear was nominated for an Academy Award for Best Animated Short Film, but lost to Disney's Lend a Paw.

See also
 The Bear That Couldn't Sleep
 Bah Wilderness
 Goggle Fishing Bear
 Wee-Willie Wildcat
 Bird-Brain Bird Dog
 The Fishing Bear

References

External links

Metro-Goldwyn-Mayer animated short films
1941 films
1941 animated films
1941 short films
1940s American animated films
1940s animated short films
Films scored by Scott Bradley
Films directed by Rudolf Ising
Films produced by Fred Quimby
Films about American military personnel
Films about dreams
Barney Bear films
Metro-Goldwyn-Mayer cartoon studio short films